Liquid additive manufacturing (LAM) is an additive manufacturing technique which deposits a liquid or high viscosity material (e.g Liquid Silicone Rubber) onto a build surface to create an object which then vulcanised using heat to harden the object. The process was originally created by Adrian Bowyer and was then built upon by the company German RepRap.

References 

3D printing processes